Karen or Raissa Kelly (born in Blois in 1976) is a French singer in Tachelhit.

Biography 
Kelly was born in 1976 from a French-Portuguese couple living in Blois in the department of Loir-et-Cher in France.

In 1988, Kelly visited Casablanca in Morocco together with her family. Aged 12 and during this trip, she was inspired to learn more about the Moroccan culture and languages.

In the end of 1991, she was invited to sing in Tashelhit in the national theater of Mohammed V in  Rabat. After this appearance, she collaborated with several rways such as Hassan Arsmouk and mostly Hassan Aglawo under her artistic name Rayssa Kelly.

Songs 
Since her start during the early 1990s, Kelly has produced several recordings until her last album in 2002. Some of her songs are:

 Album 1996 with Hassan Aglawo - Warda Vision
 Arbi Moulay Sidi a Moulana
 Mani Mousoul N'ka
 Ourid Oukane
 Arsoulour Talat
 Almousamiha
 A Mounat
 Album 2002 - Warda Vision
 Abou Tabla
 Marhba ya Marhba
 Ghika tga Tuderti
 Timizar
 Hourma ya sidi Lahfo
 Youighkid Aluban Itfilit

See also 
 Tashelhit
 Naima Moujahid
 Fatima Tabaamrant
Jennifer Grout
 Hassan Arsmouk

References 

French women singers
Berber musicians
Living people
1976 births
Shilha people